is a Japanese writer, journalist, educator, cultural anthropologist, folklorist, and sociologist whose research focuses on expatriate Chinese communities.

As Professor of International Relations at Shizuoka Prefectural University, Takagi regularly appeared on TV programs such as Shizuoka Daiichi Television, and served as Assistant Scoutmaster of Shizuoka Scout Group 42.

Works 
 高木桂蔵著『「天皇」が日本人を動かす』はまの出版、1989年。
 高木桂蔵著『北京を支配する始皇帝の血』はまの出版、1989年。
 高木桂蔵著『客家――中国の内なる異邦人』講談社、1991年。
 高木桂蔵著『客家がわかればアジアが見える――逆境を生き抜く回天の知恵』光文社、1994年。
 高木桂蔵著『客家の鉄則――人生の成功を約束する「仲」「業」「血」「財」「生」の奥義』ごま書房、1995年。
 高木桂蔵著『華僑の商法――中国人――強さの秘密』総合法令出版、1995年。
 高木桂蔵著『華僑のサクセス訓』七賢出版、1995年。
 高木桂蔵著『『中国はノーと言える』の読み方――日本人は、なぜ中国人に嫌われるのか』ごま書房、1996年。
 高木桂蔵述『静岡県の風水――環境地理学のすすめ』静岡県建設業協会・昭和会、1998年。
 高木桂蔵著『日本人は、なぜ中国人に嫌われるのか』ごま書房、1998年。
 高木桂蔵著『客家の鉄則――世界を動かす"東洋のユダヤ人"』ゴマブックス、2005年。
 高木桂蔵著『静岡女性のための風水』静岡新聞社、2008年。
 高木桂蔵稿「開封『重建清真寺記』について――中国へやってきたユダヤ人」辻村明・金両基編著『異文化との出会い』北樹出版、1988年。
 高木桂蔵稿「客家人・孫眉について」上野明・鈴木啓介編著『ボーダーレス時代の国際関係』北樹出版、1991年。
 高木桂蔵稿「静岡県郷土唱歌の現代的意義」静岡県立大学国際関係学部日本文化コース編『テクストとしての日本――「外」と「内」の物語』静岡県立大学国際関係学部、2001年。
 高木桂蔵稿「出島竹斉と歌集『沖の千重波』」静岡県立大学国際関係学部国際行動学コース編『グローバルとローカル』静岡県立大学国際関係学部、2002年。

References

External links

Scouting in Japan
1941 births
Living people